Kolageran may refer to:
 Antarramut, Armenia
 Dzoraget, Armenia